Martin Knoller (18 November 1725 – 24 July 1804) was an Austrian-Italian painter active in Italy who is remembered for his fresco work.

Biography

Born in Steinach am Brenner near the Austrian city of Innsbruck, Knoller studied under Paul Troger and Michelangelo Unterberger in Salzburg and Vienna. Specializing in frescoes and altarpiece paintings, his first fresco, the Glory of St Stephen, was completed in 1754 at the parish church of Anras in East Tyrol.<ref>"Martin Knoller", The Concise Grove Dictionary of Art, 2002, Oxford University Press. Retrieved 12 September 2012.</ref>

In 1755, he arrived in Rome where he was influenced by Neoclassicism, after studying under Anton Raphael Mengs and Johann Joachim Winckelmann. His works cover both Baroque and Rococo, the latter prevailing in his paintings rather than in his frescoes. His greatest patron was Karl Joseph von Firmian, the Imperial Governor of Lombardy under Maria Theresa who commissioned him to paint the Palazzo Firmian-Vigoni. From 1793, he taught at the Brera Academy of Fine Arts in Milan where he died in 1804. Among his pupils was Giuseppe Mazzola.

Art
His works often depict groups of figures, the principal subject always clearly located in the foreground. He uses bright colors, especially for clothing. In Knoller's work, individuals are dominant. He has a less rigid approach to classicism, the colours are less powerful while the composition is clear and well-ordered, free of Baroque pathos. A master of perspective, he depicts his figures in unusual attitudes.

Works
Frescoes:
Anras Church, East Tyrol (1754)
Karlskirche, Volders near Innsbruck (1765)
Ettal Abbey near Oberammergau (1769)
Neresheim Abbey (1770–1775)
Gries bei Bozen Abbey (1772–1775)
Palazzo Belgioioso, Milan (1781)
Taxis Palais, Innsbruck (1785–1786)

Altarpieces:
Karlkirche, Volders
Servitenkirche, Innsbruck
Parish church of Steinach am BrennerSt George and the Dragon, Deutschhauskirche, Bolzano

References

Bibliography
Karl Weiß, Knoller, Martin. In: Allgemeine Deutsche Biographie (ADB). Vol 16, Duncker & Humblot, Leipzig 1882, p. 321–323. 
Hanns-Paul Ties, Paul Troger, seine Schüler, seine Zeit. Neufunde und Neuzuschreibungen zur Tiroler Barockmalerei'', in: Der Schlern, Zeitschrift für Südtiroler Landeskunde, 86, No. 7/8 2012, p. 143 et seq.

External links

18th-century Italian painters
Italian male painters
19th-century Italian painters
18th-century Austrian painters
18th-century Austrian male artists
Austrian male painters
19th-century Austrian painters
19th-century Austrian male artists
Academic staff of Brera Academy
1725 births
1804 deaths
Catholic painters
19th-century Italian male artists
18th-century Italian male artists